California's 36th congressional district is a U.S. congressional district in California. The 36th district is located primarily in the South Bay and Westside regions of Los Angeles. It takes in the cities of Beverly Hills, Santa Monica, Hermosa Beach, Rancho Palos Verdes, Redondo Beach, Palos Verdes Estates, Rolling Hills Estates, El Segundo, Lomita, Manhattan Beach, and the west side of Torrance, as well as the Los Angeles neighborhoods of Venice, Playa del Rey, Palms, Cheviot Hills, Westwood Village, West Los Angeles, Mar Vista, Westchester, Marina Peninsula, and west side Harbor City.

The district is represented by Democrat Ted Lieu.

Competitiveness

In statewide races

Composition

Los Angeles County is split between this district, the 32nd district, the 30th district, the 37th district, the 43rd district, and the 44th district. The 36th and 32nd are partitioned by Adelaide Dr, 602 Kingman Dr-800 Woodacres Rd, The Riviera Country Club, 26th St, Montana Ave, S Bristol Ave, Wellesley Ave/Centinela Ave, 1009 Centinela Ave/1165Centinela Ave, Highway 2, Butler Ave, Purdue Ave, Cotner Ave, Pontius Ave, Santa Monica Blvd, Glendon Ave, Malcolm Ave, Wilshire Blvd, Veteran Ave, W Sunset Blvd, Tower Rd, Franklin Canyon Reservoir, Lago Vista Dr, Monte Cielo Dr, 1280 Coldwater Canyon Dr-1210 Coldwater Canyon Dr, Greystone Park, Ridgecrest Dr, Schuyler Rd, Cherokee Ln, Loma Vista Dr, 400 N Evelyn Pl-1966 Carla Ridge, Ridgemont Dr, Crescent Dr, 410 Martin Ln-1016 N Hillcrest Rd, Sierra Mar Dr, and La Collin Dr.

The 36th, 30th and 37th are partitioned by Phyllis Ave, N Doheny Dr, N Oakhurst Dr, Burton Way, N Robertson Blvd, 8733 Clifton Way-201 S Le Doux Rd, N San Vicente Blvd, La Cienga Park, S Le Doux Rd, Gregory Way, S Robertson Blvd, Whitworth Dr, Beverly Green Dr, 1271 Beverly Green Dr-1333 Beverly Green Dr, Heath Ave, S Moreno Dr, Highway 2, Century Park W, W Pico Blvd, Patricia Ave, Lorenzo Pl, Monte Mar Dr, Beverwill Dr, Castle Heights Ave, Club Dr, McConnell Dr, National Blvd, Palms Blvd, Overland Ave, Venice Blvd, Highway 405, W Havelock Ave, S St Nicholas Ave, Ballona Creek, and Centinela Creek Channel.

The 36th, 43rd and 44th are partitioned by W Florence Ave, Arbor Vitae St, Westchester Parkway, La Tijera Blvd, W 91st St, Cum Laude Ave, W 92nd St, Waterview St, Napoleon St, Vista Del Mar, W Imperial Highway, Aviation Blvd, Del Aire Park, E Sl Segundo Blvd, S Aviation Blvd, Marine Ave, Inglewood Ave, Highway 91, Redondo Beach Blvd, Hawthorne Blvd, Sepulveda Blvd, Normandie Ave, Frampton Ave, 253rd St, 255th St, Belle Porte Ave, 256th St, 1720 256th St-1733 256th St, 1701 257th St-1733 257th St, 1734 257th St-W 262nd St, Ozone Ave, 263rd St, 26302 Alta Vista Ave-26356 Alta Vista Ave, Pineknoll Ave, Leesdale Ave, Highway 213, Palos Verde Dr N, 26613 Leesdale Ave-Navy Field, S Western Ave, Westmont Dr, Eastview Park, Mt Rose Rd/Amelia Ave, 1102 W Bloomwood Rd-1514 Caddington Dr, N Western Ave, W Summerland St, N Enrose Ave/Miraleste Dr, Miraleste Dr, and the Martin J. Bogdanovich Recreation Center and Park.

Cities & CDP with 10,000 or more people
 Los Angeles - 3,898,747
 Santa Monica - 93,076
 Redondo Beach - 71,576
 Rancho Palos Verdes - 42,287
 Manhattan Beach - 35,506
 Beverly Hills - 32,701
 Lomita - 20,921
 Hermosa Beach - 19,728
 El Segundo - 17,272
 Palos Verdes Estates - 13,347

2,500-10,000 people
 Rolling Hills Estates - 8,280

List of members representing the district

Election results

1962

1964

1966

1968

1970

1972

1974

1976

1978

1980

1982

1984

1986

1988

1990

1992

1994

1996

1998

2000

2002

2004

2006

2008

2010

2011 (Special)

2012

2014

2016

2018

2020

2022

Historical district boundaries
From 1993 to 2013, the 36th was located in southwestern Los Angeles County and included Manhattan Beach, Hermosa Beach, Torrance, Redondo Beach, and portions of Los Angeles itself. This district was largely dismantled after the 2010 census, and moved east to Riverside County and includes Palm Springs and La Quinta. The current 36th is largely the successor of the old 45th district.

See also
List of United States congressional districts

References

External links
GovTrack.us: California's 36th congressional district
RAND California Election Returns: District Definitions
California Voter Foundation map - CD36

36
Congressional 36
Coachella Valley
Blythe, California
Cabazon, California
Calimesa, California
Cathedral City, California
Coachella, California
Desert Hot Springs, California
Indian Wells, California
Indio, California
Joshua Tree National Park
Murrieta, California
Palm Desert, California
Palm Springs, California
Rancho Mirage, California
San Bernardino National Forest
San Jacinto Mountains
Temecula, California
Yucaipa, California
Constituencies established in 1963
1963 establishments in California